U-12, U 12, or U-XII may refer to:

 , any one of several German submarines
 , a U-5-class submarine of the Austro-Hungarian Navy
 Udet U 12 Flamingo, a German biplane
 U12 (Berlin U-Bahn), a former railway line
 Under-12, an age classification in many youth sports